¡Paso a la juventud..! ("Pass to the Young") is a 1958 Mexican film. It was produced by 
Fernando de Fuentes.

External links
 

1958 films
Mexican musical comedy films
1950s Spanish-language films
1950s Mexican films